William Goodwin Beggs (13 August 1878 – 4 January 1957) was an Australian rules footballer who played with St Kilda in the Victorian Football League (VFL).

References

External links 

1878 births
1957 deaths
Australian rules footballers from Victoria (Australia)
St Kilda Football Club players